IUM may refer to:

Independent University of Moscow
International University of Management in Windhoek, Namibia
International University of Monaco
Internet Usage Manager, a product by Hewlett-Packard in its OpenView framework

See Also 
Ium (disambiguation)